Orlando Eugene González (born November 15, 1951) is a Cuban former professional baseball first baseman / outfielder, who played in Major League Baseball during three seasons for the Cleveland Indians, Philadelphia Phillies, and Oakland Athletics. He batted and threw left-handed.

González came to the United States from Cuba with his family at nine years old and went on to play baseball at Miami Senior High School, Miami Dade College and the University of Miami. He was named to the College Baseball All-America Team after batting .402 and stealing an NCAA-record 62 bases in 1974 and was featured in Faces in the Crowd in the August 5, 1974 issue of Sports Illustrated. He was drafted by the Cleveland Indians in the 18th round (410th overall) of the 1974 Major League Baseball draft.

References

External links

Orlando González at Pura Pelota (Venezuelan Professional Baseball League)

1951 births
Living people
Cardenales de Lara players
Cuban expatriate baseball players in Venezuela
Cleveland Indians players
Daytona Beach Explorers players
Gold Coast Suns (baseball) players
Major League Baseball first basemen
Major League Baseball outfielders
Major League Baseball players from Cuba
Cuban expatriate baseball players in the United States
Miami Hurricanes baseball players
Oakland Athletics players
Oklahoma City 89ers players
Philadelphia Phillies players
San Antonio Brewers players
Toledo Mud Hens players
All-American college baseball players
Miami Senior High School alumni